This is a list of members of the 1st Parliament of Zimbabwe, which began in 1980 and expired in 1985. Per the Lancaster House Agreement, 20 out of the 100 seats in the House of Assembly and 10 out of the 40 seats in the Senate were reserved for white Zimbabweans. The Parliament's membership was set by the 1980 Southern Rhodesian general election, which gave ZANU–PF a nearly 57 percent majority of common seats in the House of Assembly, with PF–ZAPU taking most of the remaining seats. The 20 seats reserved for whites were initially all held by the conservative Rhodesian Front, but a majority later became independents.

Composition

Senate

House of Assembly

Senate

Common seats

White seats

House of Assembly

Common seats

White seats

Membership changes

Senate

House of Assembly

Notes and references

Notes

References 

members of the 1st Parliament of Zimbabwe